Convoy SC 19 was the 19th of the numbered series of World War II Slow Convoys of merchant ships from Sydney, Cape Breton Island to Liverpool. The trade convoy left Halifax, Nova Scotia on 12 January 1941 and was found by U-boats of the 7th U-boat Flotilla on 29 January. Seven ships were sunk before the convoy reached Liverpool on 2 February.

Ships in the convoy

Allied merchant ships
A total of 28 merchant vessels joined the slow convoy, composed of ships making 8 knots or less.

Convoy escorts
A series of armed military ships escorted the convoy at various times during its journey.

References

Bibliography

External links
SC.19 at convoyweb

SC019
Naval battles of World War II involving Canada
C